Kukru is a village in the Kukru CD block in the Chandil subdivision of the Seraikela Kharsawan district in the Indian state of Jharkhand.

Geography

Location

Area overview
The area shown in the map has been described as “part of the southern fringe of the Chotanagpur plateau and is a hilly upland tract”. 75.7% of the population lives in the rural areas and 24.3% lives in the urban areas.

Note: The map alongside presents some of the notable locations in the district. All places marked in the map are linked in the larger full screen map.

Civic administration
The headquarters of Kukru CD block are located at Kukru village.

Demographics
According to the 2011 Census of India, Kukru had a total population of 3,292, of which 1,718 (52%) were males and 1,574 (48%) were females. Population in the age range 0–6 years was 540. The total number of literate persons in Kukru was 1,626 (59.08% of the population over 6 years).

(*For language details see Kukru block#Language and religion)

Education
Saheed Nirmal Mahato High School is a Hindi-medium coeducational institution established in 1993. It has facilities for teaching from class VI to class X.

References

Villages in Seraikela Kharsawan district